HutP (Histidine utilizing Protein) is one of the anti-terminator proteins of Bacillus subtilis, which is responsible for regulating the expression of the hut structural genes of this organism in response to changes in the intracellular levels of L-histidine and divalent metal ions. In the hut operon, HutP is located just downstream from the promoter, while the five other subsequent structural genes, hutH, hutU, hutI, hutG and hutM, are positioned far downstream from the promoter. In the presence of L-histidine and divalent metal ions, HutP binds to the nascent hut mRNA leader transcript. This allows the anti-terminator to form, thereby preventing the formation of the terminator and permitting transcriptional read-through into the hut structural genes.

HutP is a 16.2 kDa protein consisting of 148 amino acid residues. HutP also exists in five other Bacillus species, including B. anthracis, B. cereus, B. halodurans, B. thuringiensis, and Geobacillus kautophilus, with 60% sequence identity.  Thirumananseri Kumarevel solved the crystal structure of the HutP protein in the apo-form, binary complex (complexed with divalent metal ions or L-histidine), ternary complex (HutP-metal ions-L-histidine) and quaternary complexes (HutP-L-histidine-metal ions-RNA) and elegantly revealed the snapshots of metal-ion mediated anti-termination mechanism for the first time.

References
1. T. S. Kumarevel, H. Mizuno, P. K. R. Kumar, Structural basis of HutP-mediated anti-termination and roles of the Mg2+ ion and L-histidine ligand, Nature 434 (2005) 183-191.

2. T. S. Kumarevel, Z. Fujimoto, P. Karthe, M. Oda, H. Mizuno, P. K. R. Kumar, Crystal structure of activated HutP; an RNA binding protein that regulates transcription of the hut operon in Bacillus subtilis, Structure 12 (2004) 1269–1280.

3. T. S. Kumarevel, H. Mizuno, P. K. R. Kumar, Allosteric activation of HutP protein, that regulates transcription of hut operon in Bacillus subtilis, mediated by various analogs of histidine, Nucleic Acids Res suppl. 3 (2003) 199–200.

4. M. Oda, N. Kobayashi, A. Ito, Y. Kurusu, K. Taira, cis-acting regulatory sequences for antitermination in the transcript of the Bacillus subtilis hut operon and histidine-dependent binding of HutP to the transcript containing the regulatory sequences, Mol. Microbiol. 35 (2000) 1244–1254. 
 
5. T. S. Kumarevel, H. Mizuno, P. K. R. Kumar, Characterization of the metal ion binding site in the anti-terminator protein, HutP, of Bacillus subtilis, Nucleic Acids Res. 33 (2005) 5494–5502.

6. T. S. Kumarevel, S. C. B. Gopinath, S. Nishikawa, H. Mizuno, P. K. R. Kumar, Identification of important chemical groups of the hut mRNA for HutP interactions that regulate the hut operon in Bacillus subtilis, Nucleic Acids Res. 32, (2004) 3904–3912.

Bacterial proteins
Bacillus